WKLV may refer to any of the following radio stations:

WKLV (AM) (1440 kHz) a radio station in Blackstone, Virginia
WKLV-FM (93.5 MHz) a radio station in Butler, Alabama
WARW (FM) (96.7 MHz) a radio station in Port Chester, New York, which held the call sign WKLV-FM from 2011 to 2019, while an affiliate of K-LOVE